Uwe 'Zimbo' Zimmermann (born 11 February 1962 in Kronau) is a German football coach and a former player. His son Simon Zimmermann is a professional footballer in the lower level German leagues.

Honours

Club
VfL Wolfsburg
 DFB-Pokal finalist: 1994–95

Individual
 Most ever Bundesliga games for SV Waldhof Mannheim: 215

References

External links

1962 births
Living people
People from Karlsruhe (district)
Sportspeople from Karlsruhe (region)
Footballers from Baden-Württemberg
German footballers
German football managers
Germany under-21 international footballers
Association football goalkeepers
SV Waldhof Mannheim players
SC Fortuna Köln players
VfL Wolfsburg players
Eintracht Braunschweig players
Bundesliga players
2. Bundesliga players
West German footballers